John Jansen may refer to:

John Jansen (politician) (born 1947), former mayor of Chilliwack, BC, and former member of British Columbia Legislative Assembly
John Jansen (water polo) (born 1963), retired water polo player from the Netherlands
John Jansen (record producer), American recording engineer and music producer
John Jansen (rugby league)

See also
Jon Jansen, former American football player